Stanisław Lubomirski may refer to:

 Stanisław Lubomirski (d. 1585) (16th-century–1585), Polish nobleman
 Stanisław Lubomirski (1583–1649), Polish-Lithuanian nobleman
 Stanisław Herakliusz Lubomirski (1642–1702), Polish nobleman
 Stanisław Lubomirski (1704–1793), Polish noble and magnate
 Stanisław Lubomirski (1722–1782), Polish nobleman